Al Markada, also spelled Al Marked or Al Markad or Al Merkad, is a locality in Dubai, United Arab Emirates (UAE).  Located in western Dubai in Bur Dubai, Al Markada is bordered to the north by Zabeel and Business Bay, to the south by Nad Al Sheba and Al Quoz and to the east by Bu Kadra.  It is bounded to the north by route E 44 (Al Khail Road) and to the south by route D 69 (Muscat Road).  

Al Markada is primarily known for its camel race course and is not a residential community.  The Nad Al Sheba Racecourse is located about 2.7 km southwest of Al Markada.

References 

Communities in Dubai